Emmermann is a German surname. Notable people with the surname include:

Carl Emmermann (1915–1990), German U-boat commander

See also
15513 Emmermann, a main-belt asteroid
Emmelmann

German-language surnames